Tripadvisor, Inc. is an American company that operates online travel agencies, comparison shopping websites, and mobile apps with user-generated content.

Its namesake brand, Tripadvisor.com, operates in 40 countries and 20 languages and features approximately 1 billion reviews and opinions on approximately 8 million establishments. The company's other brands include Bokun.io, Cruise Critic, FlipKey, TheFork, Holiday Lettings, Housetrip, Jetsetter, Niumba, SeatGuru, and Viator. The company is headquartered in Needham, Massachusetts.

In 2022, Tripadvisor earned 35% of its revenues from Expedia Group and Booking Holdings and their subsidiaries, primarily for pay-per-click advertising.

History

Tripadvisor LLC was founded by Stephen Kaufer, Langley Steinert, Nick Shanny, and Thomas Palka in February 2000. Kaufer came up with the idea after being frustrated planning a family vacation.

In September 2000, before the website was launched, the company obtained $2 million in financing. 
Seed money was obtained from Flagship Ventures, the Bollard Group, and private investors.

In 2004, the company was acquired by IAC/InterActiveCorp. In August 2005, IAC spun off its travel group of businesses under the Expedia, Inc. name.

In 2007, the company acquired Smarter Travel Media, operator of SmarterTravel.com; BookingBuddy.com; SeatGuru.com; TravelPod.com; Travel-Library.com; and The Independent Traveler, Inc., publisher of Cruise Critic and IndependentTraveler.com. In 2008, the company acquired Holiday Watchdog, a user-generated travel site in the United Kingdom; Airfarewatchdog; Virtualtourist, a travel website with reportedly about one million registered members; OneTime.com, a travel comparison site; and a majority stake in FlipKey, a vacation-rental website.

In April 2009, Tripadvisor launched in China. The company acquired Kuxun.cn, China's second-largest consumer travel site and hotel and flight search engine, in October 2009. In August 2015, Kuxun was sold to Meituan.

In June 2010, the company acquired holidaylettings.co.uk, the largest independent vacation rental website in the United Kingdom. In September 2010, SmarterTravel, part of TripAdvisor Media Group, launched SniqueAway (now Jetsetter), the first members-only site where each travel deal is endorsed by member reviews. In July 2011, the company acquired Where I've Been, a Chicago-based Facebook app.

In December 2011, Expedia completed the corporate spin-off of Tripadvisor into a public company.

The company acquired Wanderfly, an NYC-based travel inspiration website, in October 2012. In 2013, the company acquired Jetsetter, a flash sale site; GateGuru, a flight and airport information mobile app; and Oyster.com, a hotel review and photography website. In 2014, the company acquired Vacation Home Rentals; Tripod; LaFourchette, which became theFork, for $140 million; Viator for $200 million; Mytable; Restopolis; and Tripbod, a London-based travel community

In 2015, the company acquired Iens, a Dutch restaurant review website; SeatMe, a Dutch table reservation website, ZeTrip, Inc., including its product Rove, a personal journal app that helps users log activities including places they have visited and photos they have taken; Portuguese startup BestTables, and Australian startup Dimmi for $25 million. In April 2016, the company acquired HouseTrip, a holiday rental marketplace based in London. In August 2016, Tripadvisor acquired Citymaps.com, which developed a social mapping site and cross-platform map engine based on OpenStreetMap data. In April 2018, the company acquired Icelandic startup Bokun, a provider of software for travel booking, and in November 2018, the company added DoorDash to its restaurant listings.

In December 2019, Tripadvisor acquired SinglePlatform, a platform that syndicates restaurant menus, from its parent company, Endurance International Group, for $51 million. It also acquired BookATable from Michelin Guide.

In February 2020, the company changed its name from TripAdvisor to Tripadvisor, using a lowercase "a".

In April 2020, during the COVID-19 pandemic, Tripadvisor announced 600 layoffs in Canada and the United States and 300 more in other countries as part of a 25% reduction in workforce. The company also closed offices in downtown Boston and San Francisco. In July 2020, Tripadvisor sold 8 brands to Hopjump: Smarter Travel, Airfarewatchdog, BookingBuddy, OneTime, Oyster.com, Family Vacation Critic, What To Pack, and Holiday Watchdog.

On December 8, 2020, China blocked 105 apps, including Tripadvisor, from mobile app stores. The Cyberspace Administration of China stated that the apps were "illegal", and that public concerns were raised around "obscene, pornographic and violent information or fraud, gambling and prostitution".

In December 2020, the Tripadvisor.com website drew 90.2 million visits, and the Tripadvisor app was among the top 10 travel apps in 26 countries as of January 2021. 

In May 2022, Matt Goldberg was announced as the new CEO of TripAdvisor, replacing Stephen Kaufer.

Controversies

Criticism of review system
Tripadvisor has been the subject of controversy for allowing unsubstantiated anonymous reviews to be posted about any hotel, bed and breakfast, inn, or restaurant.

In May 2021, Tripadvisor was criticized for allowing an offensive review to be posted about the Auschwitz-Birkenau State Museum in which a visitor described bringing a baby to the gas chambers. Tripadvisor initially stated the review complied with submission guidelines but later removed it following backlash on social media.

Blackmail
Tripadvisor has stated that it understands the potential for a guest to threaten to write a negative review unless they receive a refund, upgrade or similar reward, in a form of "blackmail", which may be illegal in some countries. Venue operators are advised to flag such threats with TripAdvisor before the guest's review is filed.

Fake reviews
Fake reviews are common and has led to criticism of the company.

In March 2014, Tripadvisor's Chinese site came under scrutiny when a user was found to have reviewed 51 Parisian restaurants in one month, while also reviewing 50 hotels in other countries.

In November 2017, Oobah Butler, a journalist for Vice Media, claimed to have made money posting positive reviews for restaurants he never visited, in exchange for payment.

In September 2019, consumer organisation Which? said Tripadvisor was still failing to stop fake reviews. Its survey of nearly 250,000 reviews for the ten top-ranked hotels in ten popular tourist destinations around the world found that one in seven had "blatant hallmarks" of fake positive reviews.

Phantom establishments
In May 2013, a fake restaurant was set up by a disgruntled businessman and reportedly had diners looking for the eatery in an alley filled with garbage cans. The fake listing went undetected on Tripadvisor for about two months.

In November 2017, journalist Oobah Butler used fake reviews to boost a nonexistent restaurant named The Shed at Dulwich to the top of Tripadvisor rankings for restaurants in London.

Reviews alleging crime
In November 2017, Tripadvisor deleted reviews by two women who were allegedly raped at the Iberostar Paraiso Maya in Playa del Carmen in separate incidents 2010 and 2015, one of which involved a hotel security guard. The women said they received assurances from hotel staff that they would contact the authorities, but the staff failed to take any follow-up action. The women then posted advisories and warnings on Tripadvisor, but the reviews were deleted. The review of first victim, Kristie Love, was eventually reinstated, but the company claimed the review of the second victim, Jamie Valeri, was "hearsay" and it was not reinstated. The reports also highlighted at least 12 other such incidents at hotels and resorts across Mexico, including one of a 29-year-old man who was raped by a massage therapist at a resort in the same area, where reviewers had attempted to warn people through reviews on the company's site about criminal incidents that the resorts and local authorities had failed to pursue any criminal or legal action for, only to have those reviews either taken down or declined for posting by Tripadvisor.

Offers by Meriton of inducements to guests in exchange for reviews
In October 2015, an ex-hotel manager at Meriton said guests were offered inducements to change ratings they left on the site. In 2018, Meriton was fined AU$3 million by the Australian Competition & Consumer Commission for misleading consumers.

Malicious reviews
In March 2015, Dietmar Doering, a German hotelier based in Sri Lanka accused Tripadvisor of hosting malicious reviews of his resort The Cosy Beach in Marawila. He claimed he was compelled to take legal action for the estimated damages of US$500,000.

In 2012, an action was brought in a Sheriff Court in Scotland, by Richard Gollin, the owner of a guesthouse in the Outer Hebrides who claimed damages for malicious statements. Tripadvisor first asserted that the Scottish courts lacked jurisdiction since it is based in the United States. However, it later conceded that it could be sued in the UK's jurisdictions. The court ruled that Tripadvisor's terms of use constituted a contract, which was actionable/enforceable by the business being reviewed. The case was found to involve issues relating to the Unfair Terms in Consumer Contracts Act of 1977, and these issues were referred to a higher court in Stornoway. The plaintiff eventually dropped the case because he could not afford to pursue it.

Fake reviews due to political affiliations of establishment
In 2019, a guesthouse being used as the headquarters for Reform UK was "trolled" by hundreds of users leaving one-star reviews on Tripadvisor. The guesthouse in Norfolk was owned by the husband of Catherine Blaiklock, the leader of the political party.

Fine for Improper commercial practices
In December 2014, the Italian Antitrust Authority fined Tripadvisor €500,000 for improper commercial practices on the Tripadvisor website. The Italian Authority said Tripadvisor and its Italian arm should stop publishing misleading information about the sources of the reviews. In June 2015, a fake restaurant created by a newspaper rose to the top of the site's rankings in Italy.

In August 2013, Kenneth Seaton lost a $10 million lawsuit against the company in which he claimed that the ranking for his Grand Resort Hotel and Convention Center in Pigeon Forge, Tennessee, as "America's dirtiest hotel" was based on unsubstantiated rumors.

Breaches of advertising standards
In September 2011, after receiving a complaint submitted by online investigations company KwikChex, the UK Advertising Standards Authority (ASA) launched a formal investigation into Tripadvisor's claims to provide trustworthy and honest reviews from travelers. The ASA found that Tripadvisor "should not claim or imply that all its reviews were from real travellers, or were honest, real or trusted", and as a result of the investigation, Tripadvisor was ordered to remove the slogan "reviews you can trust" from its UK web site. It changed its hotel review section slogan to "reviews from our community". Tripadvisor said the branding change had been planned for some time and that changes began in June 2011, before the ASA investigation. ASA commented that "it was concerned that consumers might be fooled by fraudulent posts since the entries could be made without any form of verification", but recognized that Tripadvisor used "advanced and highly effective fraud systems" in an attempt to identify and remove fake content.Approximately 30 hotels have been penalized on the website by the company for suspicious reviews, including a Cornwall hotel that bribed guests to leave positive reviews of the hotel.

Tripadvisor has stated that reviews are subject to a verification process which considers the IP address and email address of the author, and tries to detect any suspicious patterns or obscene or abusive language. The website also allows the community of users to report suspicious content, which is then assessed by Tripadvisor staff.

Data breach
In March 2011, Tripadvisor informed its members that it suffered a data breach and an unauthorized party had stolen some of its email list and might use it for spamming. No passwords or other information was stolen.

Drip pricing
In July 2012, Tripadvisor was fined $80,000 by the United States Department of Transportation for violating fair trading regulations requiring taxes and fees to be shown for prices quoted for airfares, a practice known as drip pricing. The rule had come into effect in January of that year.

Involvement in Israeli settlements

On 12 February 2020, the United Nations published a database of all business enterprises involved in specified activities relating to the Israeli settlements in the occupied Palestinian territories, including East Jerusalem, and in the occupied Golan Heights. Tripadvisor has been listed on the database in light of its involvement in activities related to "the provision of services and utilities supporting the maintenance and existence of settlements". The international community considers Israeli settlements built on land occupied by Israel to be in violation of international law.

Denigration
On November 21, 2022, the Paris Commercial Court ordered Tripadvisor to pay €57,000 in damages and other costs to Viaticum, the company that operates the Bourse-des-vols.com website, for denigration.

Awards
In 2019, Tripadvisor was named America's Best Midsize Employer by Forbes.

Maps

References

External links

 

 
2000 establishments in Massachusetts
2004 mergers and acquisitions
2011 initial public offerings
American review websites
American travel websites
American companies established in 2000
Companies based in Norfolk County, Massachusetts
Companies listed on the Nasdaq
Consumer guides
Corporate spin-offs
Expedia Group
Hospitality companies established in 2000
Internet properties established in 2000
Needham, Massachusetts
Online marketplaces of the United States
Software companies based in Massachusetts
Software companies established in 2000
Software companies of the United States